Ellen Serwaa Nee-Whang (born 2 November 1952 in Ghana) is a retired Ghanaian diplomat.

Education 
She had her secondary education at Aburi Girls' Senior High School, where she obtained GCE Ordinary Level and Advanced Level. In 1973 she earned a degree in English and a Postgraduate Diploma in International Relations at the University of Ghana.

Career 
In 1974 she joined the foreign service of her country. From 1985 to 1989, she worked as a counsellor at the representation of Ghana in Monrovia, Liberia, and was entrusted with the management of the embassy chancery.Between 1989 and 1993 she worked in the Ministry of Foreign Affairs of Ghana (Policy Planning and Research Bureau).From 1993 to 1997, she was the head of embassy chancery at the Permanent Mission of Ghana at the United Nations Office in Geneva, Switzerland.From April 2000 to November 2005, she was High Commissioner in Pretoria, South Africa with simultaneous accreditation from the governments in Maseru, Antananarivo, Port Louis, Victoria, Mbabane and Moroni.From January 2006 to October 2008, she worked as a senior civil servant in capacity of Chief Director of the Ministry of Foreign Affairs and Regional Integration.From November 2008 to December 2012, she was Ambassador in Berne, Switzerland with simultaneous accreditation from the government in Vienna, Austria. She was also Ambassador and Permanent Representative to the United Nations Office in Geneva from 2009 till 2012. She retired at the end of her service in 2012.

References 

1952 births
Living people
High Commissioners of Ghana to South Africa
Ambassadors of Ghana to Switzerland
Ambassadors of Ghana to Austria
High Commissioners of Ghana to Lesotho
Ambassadors of Ghana to Madagascar
High Commissioners of Ghana to Mauritius
High Commissioners of Ghana to Eswatini
Ambassadors of Ghana to the Comoros
Ghanaian women ambassadors
University of Ghana alumni
Alumni of Aburi Girls' Senior High School